Axinidris denticulata is a species of ant in the genus Axinidris. Described by William Morton Wheeler in 1922, the species is endemic to the Democratic Republic of Congo.

References

Axinidris
Hymenoptera of Africa
Insects described in 1922